Liang Jingkun (born 20 October 1996) is a Chinese table tennis player. Two-time medalist in men's singles at the World Table Tennis Championships.

Career
A top junior player with huge potential, Liang made a breakthrough in 2015 when he was surprisingly selected to represent China at the World Championships. He competed in the men's singles event, where he made it to the round of 32 before getting eliminated by his teammate, Zhang Jike. He also competed in the 2019 World Championships where he surprisingly beat Fan Zhendong in the Round of 16 but ended up losing in the semi-finals to 
Ma Long.

2021
In May, Liang played in the Chinese Olympic Scrimmages. He lost to Xu Xin 4–0 in the quarter-finals of the second leg of the scrimmage.

In September, Liang reached the semi-finals of the China National Games, where he lost to Fan Zhendong. He then defeated Wang Chuqin to take the bronze medal.

In November, Liang won two WTT titles in Slovenia. He continued to reach semifinals at the 2021 World Championships in both singles and men's doubles.

2022
In March, Liang won WTT Contender title in Muscat by defeating Lin Gaoyuan in the final. He also advanced to semifinals at the WTT Singapore Smash. These results made him reach the third spot of the world ranking on 22 March. In July, Liang lost to Truls Möregårdh and Chuang Chih-yuan respectively in two WTT events held in Budapest.

In October, Liang represented China at the 2022 World Team Championships, but only played two matches in group stage. At the WTT Champions Macao, Liang was drawn to face compatriot Lin Gaoyuan in the first round. He won the match against Lin in the deciding fifth game, but suffered a loss in the next round against Alexis Lebrun. After the match against Lin Gaoyuan, Liang put the racket in his shorts. The controversial celebrations made Chinese Table Tennis Association suspend Liang from any table tennis competitions for the rest of 2022.

2023

Singles titles

References

External links

Liang Jingkun at Table Tennis Media

Chinese male table tennis players
1996 births
Living people
Sportspeople from Tangshan
Table tennis players from Hebei
Asian Games medalists in table tennis
Table tennis players at the 2018 Asian Games
Asian Games gold medalists for China
Medalists at the 2018 Asian Games
World Table Tennis Championships medalists